Radical 191 or radical fight meaning "" is one of the 8 Kangxi radicals (214 radicals in total) composed of 10 strokes.

In the Kangxi Dictionary, there are 23 characters (out of 49,030) to be found under this radical.

 is also the 190th indexing component in the Table of Indexing Chinese Character Components predominantly adopted by Simplified Chinese dictionaries published in mainland China. However, this radical character  and former radical 169  "door" were merged to  during the simplification.  is therefore no longer in use in Simplified Chinese and is retained as an indexing component only for historical reasons.

Evolution

Derived characters

References

Literature 

191
190